Maplewood is a city in Ramsey County, Minnesota, United States. The population was 42,088 at the 2020 census. Maplewood is ten minutes' drive from downtown Saint Paul. It stretches along the northern and eastern borders of Saint Paul.

Maplewood is home to the corporate headquarters and main campus of 3M Corporation. The city is also home to the Maplewood Mall and St. John's Hospital.

Geography

U.S. Highway 61, Minnesota Highway 36, and Interstate Highways 35E, 94, 694, and 494 are six of the main routes in the city.

The city is noteworthy for its unique shape, extending 5.9 miles east to west and 10 miles north to south with a 7.5 mile long nearly 1 mile wide southern leg.

Demographics

2010 census
As of the census of 2010, there were 38,018 people, 14,882 households, and 9,620 families living in the city. The racial makeup of the city was 75.5% White, 8.2% African American, 0.5% Native American, 10.4% Asian, 0.1% Pacific Islander, 2.4% from other races, and 2.9% from two or more races. Hispanic or Latino of any race were 6.2%.

Of the 14,882 households 30.3% had children under the age of 18 living with them, 47.8% were married couples living together, 12.1% had a female householder with no husband present, 4.7% had a male householder with no wife present, and 35.4% were non-families. 29.1% of households were one person and 12.5% were one person aged 65 or older. The average household size was 2.48 and the average family size was 3.08.

The median age was 39.3 years. 22.9% of residents were under the age of 18; 9% were between the ages of 18 and 24; 25.2% were from 25 to 44; 27.7% were from 45 to 64; and 15.2% were 65 or older. The gender makeup of the city was 48.0% male and 52.0% female.

2000 census
As of the census of 2000, there were 34,947 people, 13,758 households, and 9,190 families living in the city. The racial makeup of the city was 72.6% White, 8.0% African American, 0.4% Native American, 10.4% Asian, 0.03% Pacific Islander, 0.08% from other races, and 2.4% from two or more races. Hispanic or Latino of any race were 6.2% of the population.

Of the 13,758 households 31.6% had children under the age of 18 living with them, 52.8% were married couples living together, 10.5% had a female householder with no husband present, and 33.2% were non-families. 27.0% of households were one person and 11.1% were one person aged 65 or older.  The average household size was 2.48 and the average family size was 3.04.

The age distribution was 24.7% under the age of 18, 7.7% from 18 to 24, 30.0% from 25 to 44, 22.6% from 45 to 64, and 15.0% 65 or older.  The median age was 38 years. For every 100 females, there were 91.5 males.  For every 100 females age 18 and over, there were 87.8 males.

The median household income was $51,596 and the median family income was $63,049. Males had a median income of $43,033 versus $30,557 for females. The per capita income for the city was $24,387.  About 3.0% of families and 4.8% of the population were below the poverty line, including 4.9% of those under age 18 and 5.6% of those age 65 or over.

The current city council includes the following five members:

Economy
According to the city's 2020 Comprehensive Annual Financial Report, the largest employers in the city are:

Notable people 
 Jim O'Brien (born 1989), professional ice hockey player for the Thomas Sabo Ice Tigers
 Audra Morrison (born 1994), professional ice hockey player for the Minnesota Whitecaps
 Allie Thunstrom (born 1988), professional ice hockey player for the Minnesota Whitecaps

References

Populated places established in 1957
Cities in Minnesota
Cities in Ramsey County, Minnesota
1957 establishments in Minnesota